

Codes

References

O